Fabián Antonio Ahumada Astete (born 26 April 1996) is a Chilean footballer who plays for Palestino.

International career
Ahumada was born in Chile and is of Palestinian descent. He was called up to represent the Palestine U23s in 2018, but did not make an appearance.

References

1996 births
Living people
Footballers from Santiago
Chilean footballers
Chilean people of Palestinian descent
Chilean Primera División players
Club Deportivo Palestino footballers
Coquimbo Unido footballers
Association football midfielders